Mihail Titow (born 18 October 1997) is a Turkmenistani professional footballer who plays for Altyn Asyr and Turkmenistan as forward.

International career

Titow was included in Turkmenistan's squad for the 2019 AFC Asian Cup in the United Arab Emirates. He made his senior debut against Japan on 9 January 2019 at the group stage.

Career statistics

International

Statistics accurate as of match played 14 November 2019

International goals
Scores and results list Turkmenistan's goal tally first.

Personal life 
Titow is an ethnic Russian.

References

External links 
 
 
 

1997 births
Living people
Turkmenistan footballers
Association football forwards
Turkmenistan people of Russian descent
Turkmenistan international footballers
Sportspeople from Ashgabat
FC Altyn Asyr players
2019 AFC Asian Cup players